The men's 10,000 metres event at the 1991 Pan American Games was held in Havana, Cuba on 10 August.

Results

References

Athletics at the 1991 Pan American Games
1991